Halsted Street is a major north-south street in the U.S. city of Chicago, Illinois.

Location
(From Grace north to Lawrence Avenue (4800 N) in Uptown, 800 W is marked by Clarendon Avenue.)

Environs

North Side

In Lakeview Halsted passes through Wrigleyville, as intersecting with Addison Street, it is only two blocks east of Wrigley Field home of the Chicago Cubs. Halsted is then lined with restaurants, bars and gay bars and clubs as one enters Boystown, Chicago's main gay and lesbian community, running as far as Belmont Avenue. This area also contains numerous theaters and comedy clubs. As it continues south past Diversey (2800 N), it goes past DePaul University and through the Lincoln Park area, as a primary thoroughfare through the community area. South of Armitage Avenue, it passes two notable theaters: Steppenwolf and the Royal George.

Near North
At North Avenue, Halsted passes Clybourn Avenue, through the Old Town area. The former site of the Cabrini–Green housing project is at Halsted and Division (1200 N) in the Near North Side neighborhood. Halsted Street has two bridges to mark its passage over Goose Island; it is one of only two streets to completely traverse this, the Chicago River's only island.

Near West
Continuing south, Halsted soars high above feeder ramps to the Kennedy Expressway, Union Pacific Railroad and Canadian National Railway and finally the Kennedy Expressway itself to enter the West Loop. One then passes through Chicago's Greektown at Jackson Blvd (300 S). South of a high bridge over the Eisenhower Expressway, Halsted forms the eastern border of the University of Illinois at Chicago. North of Greektown is the headquarters for Weigel Broadcasting (owner of MeTV) and its local television stations (WCIU-TV, WWME-CD, and WMEU-CD), which are appropriately addressed at 26 N. Halsted Street, to honor WCIU-TV's channel number.

The Jane Addams Hull House, America's first settlement house, was located at Polk (800 S) and Halsted. The "Hull House Neighborhood," which was served by the Jane Addams settlement house, consisted of recently arrived immigrants at the turn of the 20th century.

Taylor Street (1000 S) was the port-of-call for Chicago's Italian American immigrants and became known as Chicago's Little Italy. Italians were the only ethnic group that remained after the exodus of Jews, Greeks, Irish, etc. that began shortly before the Great Depression of the 1930s. Greektown and Maxwell Street business establishments continue to exist as remnants of the mass emigration of Southern Europeans, terminated by an act of Congress in 1924.

South of an underpass allowing Halsted to cross the BNSF Railway tracks at 16th street, parallel to the Dan Ryan Expressway, Halsted grazes the eastern edge of the Pilsen neighborhood, then crosses the Chicago River's south branch.

South Side
Here Halsted Street enters Bridgeport, traditionally a working-class Irish, Lithuanian and Italian community, it has been home to five of the city's mayors. Continuing south, Halsted passes between the borders of Back of the Yards, which lies to the west side of Halsted from 40th to 55th Streets, and Canaryville, which lies on the east side of Halsted between 40th and 49th Streets. Both Canaryville and Back of the Yards historically housed many Union Stock Yards workers. The Stockyards themselves were located to the west of Halsted between Pershing (39th) and 47th. Further south, Halsted Street passes into Englewood. Kennedy-King College has its campus in the heart of Englewood at 63rd Street and Halsted Street. Further south, Halsted intersects with 71st Street, which was honorarily named for Emmett Till, a victim of the violence of white supremacy in the United States. Just south of 95th Street is the Carter G. Woodson regional branch of the Chicago Public Library. Illinois Route 1 begins at Halsted Street's interchange with Interstate 57 (at 99th Street) on the far south side, and follows Halsted through much of its length through the suburbs.

South Suburbs
Leaving Chicago and entering the village of Riverdale at the Little Calumet River near 129th St, Route 1 breaks off and is called Chicago Road, then Dixie Highway, ending at the Ohio River, at the border with the state of Kentucky.  Halsted Street continues through downtown Chicago Heights and crosses the Lincoln Highway. The road continues intermittently and ends, marked as Halstead Street, at 287th street north of Beecher, Illinois.

Public transportation
Halsted Street is served by major transportation lines. The Chicago Transit Authority's Red, Brown, and Purple Lines run nearby on the north side. The Red, Blue, Green, and Orange Lines have stations at various points along Halsted Street. The CTA also provides service on three Halsted routes:  the 8 Halsted between Broadway/Waveland and 79th Street; the 8A South Halsted between the  Red Line station and Halsted/119th (with select trips continuing to 127th/Lowe); and the 108 Halsted/95th between the  Red Line terminal and 127th/Lowe. There is a Halsted Street station on Metra commuter rail's BNSF Railway Line; and, the West Pullman stop on the Blue Island branch of Metra's Electric District commuter rail line is at Halsted and where 121st Street would be. Pace provides suburban bus service along Halsted Street from the  Red Line terminal to the south suburbs. The 352 Halsted route operates 24/7 between the  Red Line terminal and the Pace Harvey Transportation Center in Harvey, Illinois, with select trips continuing to the Pace Chicago Heights Bus Terminal at Vincennes/16th Street. The 359 Robbins/South Kedzie Avenue also runs along Halsted between the  Red Line terminal and 124th Street before turning west.

Associated persons
Professional wrestlers One Man Gang and Colt Cabana have been billed from Halsted Street, as well as Ace Steel and CM Punk.

Conrad Friberg, aka C.O. Nelson produced a film in 1934 traveling from the south end of Halsted Street to the North, across Chicago.

Etymology
The street derives its name from William H. and Caleb O. Halsted, Philadelphia bankers who made large investments in Chicago real estate through William B. Ogden, Chicago's first Mayor.  The street ran through their property, and they ceded valuable rights to the city.

Halsted has had several names, originally known as "Egyptian Road" because it led to the Little Egypt area of Illinois, it was subsequently known as First Street, then Dyer Street, after Charles Volney Dyer, a prominent Chicago physician and abolitionist.

See also

References

External links
Northalsted Merchants Association
DePaul University - Lincoln Park campus
University of Illinois at Chicago
Old Maxwell Street Market
Back of the Yards Neighborhood Council

Streets in Chicago